Air Marshal John Asamoah Bruce was a Ghanaian air force personnel and served in the Ghana Air Force. He was the Chief of Air Staff of the Ghana Air Force from June 1992 to March 2001.

References

Ghanaian military personnel
Chiefs of Air Staff (Ghana)
Ghana Air Force personnel
Bruce family of Ghana